In music, prosody is the way the composer sets the text of a vocal composition in the assignment of syllables to notes in the melody to which the text is sung, or to set the music with regard to the ambiance of the lyrics.

However, the relationship between syllables and melodic notes is just one dimension of musical prosody. According to Pat Pattison, prosody is "The appropriate relationship between elements, whatever they may be." In this sense, every element in a song can and should create prosody, because prosody is "support for what is being said." In this sense, even the number of lines in a verse or a verse's rhyme scheme can be used to create or enhance prosody.

For example, a songwriter might align downbeats or accents with stressed syllables or important words, or create musical accompaniment to the meter of the lyrics. Also, prosody can mean how the music supports the connotation, or emotive nature, of a song.

Any musical work with a singer, regardless of the genre, requires its composer or songwriter to examine the interplay between the music and the words. For example, the mood of the music typically matches that of the lyrical content: for example, when the lyrics address a sad topic, the music would sound sad, perhaps using minor chords.

Of course, composers might work differently, setting a textual mood against a contrasting musical mood. However, the term "prosody" tends to refer not to the matching of music with content, but with the matching of a melody with the language itself, so that the words being sung come across as naturally as possible. According to Mark Altrogge: "Generally when writing songs and poetry, we want to accent a phrase like we'd speak it." Melodies that do not come relatively close to approximating speech make the words hard to understand; melodies that go beyond the point of clarity and come even closer to approximating speech make the singer sound more human and therefore have a stronger emotional impact on the listener.

A melody with good prosody will not assign long notes to relatively insignificant syllables, nor will it put them on the beat or give them any sort of accentuation. The musical phrases will match the grammatical phrases, so that musical pauses happen in places that would be natural for a speaker.

See also

Anacrusis
Articulation (music)
Caesura
Meter (music)
Rhythm

References

Further reading 

Vocal music
Lyrics
Musical composition
Rhythm and meter